Meganoton hyloicoides is a rather rare moth of the family Sphingidae. It is only found in Papua New Guinea.

References

Meganoton
Moths described in 1910